Dunagan Creek is a  long 1st order tributary to the Fisher River in Surry County, North Carolina.  This is the only stream of this name in the United States.

Course
Dunagan Creek rises at Stony Knoll, North Carolina.  Dunagan Creek then flows southwest to join the Fisher River about 1.5 miles southwest of Stony Knoll.

Watershed
Dunagan Creek drains  of area, receives about 48.0 in/year of precipitation, has a wetness index of 320.76, and is about 65% forested.

See also
List of rivers of North Carolina

References

Rivers of North Carolina
Rivers of Surry County, North Carolina